The Convention on the Transfer of Sentenced Persons is an international treaty regulating the extradition and social rehabilitation of imprisoned persons. The Convention was concluded in Strasbourg on 21 March 1983 and entered into force on 1 July 1985. It has been ratified by 66 countries, including every country of the Council of Europe except Monaco. It has also been ratified by 19 states outside the Council of Europe, including Australia, Canada, Israel, Japan, South Korea, Mexico, the United States and India. The latest accession to the Convention was India in January 2018.

The Convention is intended to facilitate social rehabilitation of prisoners by providing foreigners convicted of a criminal offence the possibility of serving their sentences in their home countries. Humanitarian considerations also played a role in the drafting of the Convention, since factors such as language barriers resulting in difficulties with communication and distance from family and friends can constitute an impediment to social rehabilitation.

Terms
According to Convention, the extradition (transfer) may be requested by either the state in which the sentence was imposed (the "sentencing State") or the state of which the sentenced person is a national (the "administering State"). The transfer is subject to the consent of the two States involved, and the consent of the sentenced person.

Article 1 sets out definitions for the purposes of the Convention. It defines a sentence as "any punishment or measure involving deprivation of liberty ordered by
a court for a limited or unlimited period of time on account of a criminal offence".
 
The general principles of the Convention are outlined in Article 2, which states that Parties undertake to afford each other the widest measure of cooperation in compliance with this Convention. Article 2 also states the aim of the Convention: that a person sentenced in the territory of a Party may be transferred to the territory of another to serve the sentence imposed on him.

Article 3 sets out the conditions for the transfer, such as the condition that a sentenced person may only be transferred if that person is a national of the administering state, and if the judgment is final. It also states that any State may, at any time, by a declaration addressed to the Secretary-General of the Council of Europe, define, as far as it is concerned, the term “national” for the purposes of this Convention. Importantly, the transfer must be consented to by the sentenced person, and the sentencing State must ensure that this consent is given voluntarily and with full knowledge of its legal consequences, in accordance with Article 7.

Article 12 provides each party to the Convention the possibility to grant pardon or commutation of the sentence in accordance with its constitution or domestic laws.

Competing legislation 
For European Union nationals sentenced in another EU country, the similarly worded Council Framework Decision 2008/909/JHA applies instead of this Convention.

References

See also 
list of Council of Europe treaties

Extradition treaties
Human rights instruments
Treaties concluded in 1983
Treaties entered into force in 1985
Council of Europe treaties
1983 in France
Treaties of Albania
Treaties of Andorra
Treaties of Armenia
Treaties of Austria
Treaties of Azerbaijan
Treaties of Belgium
Treaties of Bosnia and Herzegovina
Treaties of Bulgaria
Treaties of Croatia
Treaties of Cyprus
Treaties of the Czech Republic
Treaties of Czechoslovakia
Treaties of Denmark
Treaties of Estonia
Treaties of Finland
Treaties of France
Treaties of Georgia (country)
Treaties of Germany
Treaties of Greece
Treaties of Hungary
Treaties of Iceland
Treaties of Ireland
Treaties of Italy
Treaties of Latvia
Treaties of Liechtenstein
Treaties of Lithuania
Treaties of Luxembourg
Treaties of Malta
Treaties of Moldova
Treaties of Mongolia
Treaties of Montenegro
Treaties of the Netherlands
Treaties of Norway
Treaties of Poland
Treaties of Portugal
Treaties of Romania
Treaties of Russia
Treaties of San Marino
Treaties of Serbia and Montenegro
Treaties of Slovakia
Treaties of Slovenia
Treaties of Spain
Treaties of Sweden
Treaties of Switzerland
Treaties of North Macedonia
Treaties of Turkey
Treaties of Ukraine
Treaties of the United Kingdom
Treaties of Australia
Treaties of the Bahamas
Treaties of Bolivia
Treaties of Canada
Treaties of Chile
Treaties of Costa Rica
Treaties of Ecuador
Treaties of Honduras
Treaties of Israel
Treaties of Japan
Treaties of South Korea
Treaties of Mauritius
Treaties of Mexico
Treaties of Panama
Treaties of Tonga
Treaties of Trinidad and Tobago
Treaties of the United States
Treaties of Venezuela
Treaties extended to the Faroe Islands
Treaties extended to the Netherlands Antilles
Treaties extended to Aruba
Treaties extended to the Isle of Man
Treaties extended to Anguilla
Treaties extended to the British Indian Ocean Territory
Treaties extended to the Cayman Islands
Treaties extended to the Falkland Islands
Treaties extended to Gibraltar
Treaties extended to Montserrat
Treaties extended to the Pitcairn Islands
Treaties extended to Saint Helena, Ascension and Tristan da Cunha
Treaties extended to Akrotiri and Dhekelia
Treaties extended to the British Virgin Islands
Treaties extended to Bermuda
Treaties extended to Jersey
Treaties extended to British Hong Kong
Treaties extended to Bouvet Island
Treaties extended to Peter I Island
Treaties extended to Queen Maud Land